Visk may refer to:

People
 Erna Visk (1910–1983), Estonian and Soviet politician
 Jüri Visk (1885–1957), Estonian politician

Places
 Visk, Danish name of Wisch, Nordfriesland, Denmark
 Visk, former name of Vyškovce nad Ipľom, Slovakia
 Visk, Hungarian name of Vyshkovo, Ukraine